— a  submarine — was the first ship of the United States Navy to be named for the mingo snapper.

Construction and commissioning
Mingo′s keel was laid down by the Electric Boat Company at Groton, Connecticut. She was launched on 30 November 1942, sponsored by Mrs. Henry L. Pence, and commissioned on 12 February 1943.

Operational history
After shakedown off Long Island, Mingo departed for Naval Station Newport at Newport, Rhode Island, on 1 April 1943 for three weeks of operations with the Naval Torpedo Station. She cleared Naval Submarine Base New London at New London, Connecticut on 16 May 1943 for the Pacific via the Panama Canal Zone.

First and second war patrols
After further training at Pearl Harbor, Hawaii, Mingo departed on her maiden war patrol on 25 June 1943. She made damaging attacks on three Japanese merchant ships and bombarded Sorol Island off the Palaus before returning to Pearl Harbor for refit.

Her second war patrol — from 29 September-20 November — took her to the Marshalls, Carolines, and Marianas. Her torpedoes damaged a Japanese cruiser. She departed the Hawaiian Islands for overhaul at Mare Island Navy Yard, San Pablo Bay, California. It is likely that her Hooven-Owens-Rentschler diesels were replaced with Fairbanks-Morse Model 38D8⅛ opposed piston engines during this overhaul. The submarine left the West Coast on 3 February 1944 for continued operations in the Pacific.

Third and fourth war patrols
For her third war patrol, Mingo joined the US 7th Fleet in patrolling the South China Sea. She then sailed for Brisbane, Australia, via the Bismarck Sea and Milne Bay, New Guinea, arriving on 9 May. She continued on to Manus, Admiralty Islands on 10 June for further training.

Mingo left Manus for the Philippines on 18 June on her fourth war patrol. On 7 July, she attacked a Japanese high-speed convoy off Luzon and sank the destroyer . The submarine put into Fremantle, Australia on 30 July.

Fifth and sixth war patrols
Mingo began her fifth war patrol on 27 August 1944. Although her primary operation was lifeguard duty in support of the US Thirteenth Air Force strikes on the Philippines and Borneo, she sank four coastal freighters. Mingo did a noteworthy job as lifeguard as she rescued 16 B-24 Liberator fliers shot down off Balikpapan, Borneo; six of them from rubber boats in Makassar Strait and the other 10 from the beach of Celebes Island. On 4 October, a U.S. Navy PB4Y-1 Liberator patrol bomber mistakenly attacked her, dropping a  bomb which landed  from Mingo, inflicting no damage or casualties. She moored in Fremantle on 13 October.

Her sixth war patrol, mostly reconnaissance duty, took place west of Borneo. On 25 December, Mingo made a night torpedo attack on a Japanese convoy on a run between Singapore and Brunei, Borneo. Beside damaging an escort gunboat, she sank loaded 9,486-ton tanker Manila Maru. The sinking of a maru of that name was prophetic, for the Japanese were only three months away from losing their hold completely on the ship's namesake, the Philippine capital. After assisting two other submarines in successful attacks, she returned to Fremantle on 29 December for repairs.

Seventh war patrol
Mingo took station at the South China Sea again for her seventh and last war patrol from 6 February–10 April 1945. On 14 February, she sailed to Fremantle to repair damage caused by a hurricane in which she had lost two men on 10 February. She departed on 19 February for further patrol off the Gulf of Siam before arriving in the Marianas on 10 April.

En route to Hawaii on 14 August, Mingo received word of the end of hostilities. After a short stay at Pearl Harbor, she sailed for the West Coast.

Japanese service, 1955–1966

On 1 January 1947 Mingo decommissioned at Mare Island and entered the Pacific Reserve Fleet. Recommissioned on 20 May 1955. Mingo was transferred on loan to Japan under the Military Assistance Program and renamed Kuroshio (SS-501) on 15 August. Her initial role was as an underwater training target for surface vessels. She continued to serve the Japan Maritime Self-Defense Force as Kuroshio until decommissioned on 31 March 1966. She was sunk as a target in 1973.

Awards
Mingo received five battle stars for World War II service. Five of her seven war patrols were designated "successful".

References

Bibliography

 
 Hinman, Charles R., and Douglas E. Campbell. The Submarine Has No Friends: Friendly Fire Incidents Involving U.S. Submarines During World War II. Syneca Research Group, Inc., 2019. .

External links
 navsource.org: USS Mingo
 Kill Record: USS Mingo

 

Gato-class submarines
Ships built in Groton, Connecticut
1942 ships
World War II submarines of the United States
Gato-class submarines of the Japan Maritime Self-Defense Force
Cold War history of Japan
Postwar Japan
Friendly fire incidents of World War II
Maritime incidents in October 1944
Maritime incidents in 1973
Ships sunk as targets
Shipwrecks in the Pacific Ocean